This is a list of members of the South Australian House of Assembly from 2002 to 2006, as elected at the 2002 state election:

 Kris Hanna, the member for Mitchell, was elected as a representative of the Labor Party, but resigned from the party on 30 January 2003 and joined the South Australian Greens. He later resigned from the party on 8 February 2006, after failing to win the top position on their Legislative Council ticket for the 2006 election, and served out the remainder of his term as an independent.

Members of South Australian parliaments by term
21st-century Australian politicians